Christian Jonatan Ortiz (born 20 August 1992) is an Argentine professional footballer who plays as a winger for Barcelona SC, on loan from Liga MX club Tijuana.

Career
Ortiz's career began in 2008 with Real Arroyo Seco in Torneo Argentino A, he featured ten times for the club. In 2008, Ortiz joined Huracán of the Argentine Primera División. Two years later, after no games for Huracán, Ortiz left to join Uruguayan Primera División team Racing Club. He made his professional debut on 5 September 2010 in a defeat to Liverpool, prior to scoring his first senior goal two weeks later against River Plate. He spent two seasons with Racing Club, scoring six goals in thirty-seven appearances. In July 2012, Ortiz returned to Argentine football to sign for Avellaneda's Independiente.

His Independiente debut arrived on 28 November versus Belgrano. After just two further appearances in the next four years, Ortiz joined Peruvian Primera División side Universidad San Martín on loan for the 2016 season. He went on to score twenty times, including one brace against Alianza Atlético on 18 September 2016, in forty appearances for the club. On 24 January 2017, Ortiz returned to Peru to play for Sporting Cristal on loan. He scored in his first match, netting a late consolation against Sport Rosario on 25 February. Ten more goals followed in forty-five games in all competitions for them.

Former club Universidad San Martín resigned Ortiz permanently in July 2018, seven months before he completed a return to another previous team: Sporting Cristal. He made his bow on 24 February versus Alianza Lima, prior to scoring twice on his Copa Sudamericana debut against Unión Española in May.

Career statistics
.

References

External links

1992 births
Living people
Footballers from Rosario, Santa Fe
Argentine footballers
Association football forwards
Argentine expatriate footballers
Torneo Argentino A players
Argentine Primera División players
Uruguayan Primera División players
Primera Nacional players
Peruvian Primera División players
Ecuadorian Serie A players
Real Arroyo Seco footballers
Club Atlético Huracán footballers
Racing Club de Montevideo players
Club Atlético Independiente footballers
Club Deportivo Universidad de San Martín de Porres players
Sporting Cristal footballers
C.S.D. Independiente del Valle footballers
Club Tijuana footballers
Charlotte FC players
Defensa y Justicia footballers
Expatriate footballers in Uruguay
Expatriate footballers in Peru
Expatriate footballers in Ecuador
Argentine expatriate sportspeople in Uruguay
Argentine expatriate sportspeople in Peru
Argentine expatriate sportspeople in Ecuador
Major League Soccer players